The Kinetic PreProcessor (KPP) is an open-source software tool used in atmospheric chemistry. Taking a set of chemical reactions and their rate coefficients as input, KPP generates Fortran 90, FORTRAN 77, C, or Matlab code 
of the resulting ordinary differential equations (ODEs). Solving the ODEs allows the temporal integration of the kinetic system. Efficiency is obtained by exploiting the sparsity structures of the Jacobian and of the Hessian. A comprehensive suite of stiff numerical integrators is also provided. Moreover, KPP can be used to generate the tangent linear model, as well as the continuous and discrete adjoint models of the chemical system.

Models using KPP 
 BASCOE - A data assimilation system based on a chemical transport model and created by the Belgian Institute for Space Aeronomy (BIRA-IASB)
 Boream - Model for the degradation of alpha-pinene	
 BOXMOX - Box model extensions to KPP
 CMAQ - Community Multiscale Air Quality model
 DSMACC - Dynamically Simple Model of Atmospheric Chemical Complexity
 GEOS–Chem - Global 3-D chemical transport model for atmospheric composition
 MALTE - Model to predict new aerosol formation in the lower troposphere
 MCM - Master Chemical Mechanism 
 MECCA - Module Efficiently Calculating the Chemistry of the Atmosphere
 Mistra - Microphysical Stratus model
 PACT-1D - Platform for Atmospheric Chemistry and vertical Transport in 1-dimension
 PALM - Meteorological modeling system for atmospheric and oceanic boundary layer flows
 RACM - Regional Atmospheric Chemistry Mechanism gas-phase chemistry mechanism
 WRF-Chem - Weather Research & Forecasting Model with Chemistry

See also 
 Chemical kinetics
 Autochem
 CHEMKIN
 Cantera
 Chemical WorkBench

External links
 KPP documentation
 GitHub repository
 KPP web page
 The Kinetic PreProcessor KPP 3.0.0
 The Kinetic PreProcessor KPP-2.1
 Forward, Tangent Linear, and Adjoint Runge Kutta Methods in KPP–2.2 for Efficient Chemical Kinetic Simulations
 KPPA (the Kinetic PreProcessor: Accelerated)
 KPP Fortran to CUDA source-to-source Pre-processor (Open License)

Computational chemistry software
Chemical kinetics
Environmental chemistry